The 2022 Challenger del Biobío was a professional tennis tournament played on clay courts. It was the first edition of the tournament which was part of the 2022 ATP Challenger Tour. It took place in Concepción, Chile between 14 and 20 March 2022.

Singles main draw entrants

Seeds

 1 Rankings are as of 7 March 2022.

Other entrants
The following players received wildcards into the singles main draw:
  Gonzalo Bueno
  Diego Fernández Flores
  Daniel Antonio Núñez

The following players received entry into the singles main draw as alternates:
  Evan Furness
  Paul Jubb
  Genaro Alberto Olivieri

The following players received entry from the qualifying draw:
  Hernán Casanova
  Corentin Denolly
  Daniel Dutra da Silva
  Facundo Juárez
  Juan Bautista Torres
  Gonzalo Villanueva

Champions

Singles

  Tomás Martín Etcheverry def.  Hugo Dellien 6–3, 6–2.

Doubles

  Andrea Collarini /  Renzo Olivo def.  Diego Hidalgo /  Cristian Rodríguez 6–4, 6–4.

References

Challenger del Biobío
2022 in Chilean tennis
March 2022 sports events in Chile